Nelli is a feminine given name and a surname. It may refer to:

Given name 
 Nelli Abramova (born 1940), Jewish former Soviet competitive female 
 Nelli Chervotkina (born 1965), former pair skater for the Soviet Union
 Cornelli Nelli Cooman (born 1964), former Dutch athlete of Surinamese origin
 Nelli Korovkina (born 1989), Russian footballer
 Nelli Korbukova, Soviet female sprint canoer 
 Nelli Laitinen (born 2002), Finnish ice hockey player 
 Nelli Neumann (1886–1942), German mathematician who worked in synthetic geometry
 Nelli Shkolnikova (1928–2010), Russian Jewish classical violinist 
 Nelli Tarakanova (born 1954), Ukrainian rower and medalist
 Nelli Uvarova (born 1980), Russian theater and film actress
 Nelli Voronkova (born 1972), Belarusian hurdler
 Nelli Zhiganshina (born 1987), Russian-born German ice dancer

Surname

Pre-modern era 
 Fabio Nelli (1533–?), Spanish banker
 Francesco Nelli (fl. 1363), Italian secretary of bishop Angelo Acciaioli and friend of Francesco Petrarca
 Ottaviano Nelli (1375–1444), Italian painter 
 Pietro Nelli (1672–after 1730), Italian painter of the late Baroque period
 Plautilla Nelli (1524–1588), the first-known female Renaissance painter of Florence, Italy

Modern era 
 Alessandro Nelli (1842–?), Italian founder of the Fonderia Nelli, active in Rome
 Carlos Nelli (1902–1994), Brazilian athlete
 Gabriele Nelli (born 1993), Italian male volleyball player
 Herva Nelli (1909–1994), Italian-American operatic soprano
 Renat Nelli (1906-1982), French-born leading Occitan author
 Victor Nelli Jr., American television director and producer

See also 
 Nelly (disambiguation), also lists entries for Nellie
 Nelliy Yefremova (1962–2019), Soviet sprint canoer
 Neli (disambiguation)

Feminine given names